There are at least 36 named lakes and reservoirs in Meagher County, Montana.

Lakes
 Camas Lake, el. 
 Castle Lake, el. 
 Coates Pond, el. 
 Crater Lake, el. 
 Edith Lake, el. 
 Forest Lake, el. 
 Grace Lake, el. 
 Hidden Lake, el. 
 Soldiers Lake, el. 
 Thorsens Pond, el. 
 Upper Baldy Lake, el.

Reservoirs
 Alkali Lake, el. 
 Ashford Tank, el. 
 Ayers Reservoir, el. 
 Bair Reservoir, el. 
 Bonanza Reservoir, el. 
 Buckingham Reservoir, el. 
 Christensen Reservoir, el. 
 Doggett Reservoir, el. 
 Flagstaff Reservoir, el. 
 Gipsy Lake, el. 
 Hamen Reservoir, el. 
 Hanson Reservoir, el. 
 Higgins Reservoir, el. 
 Jackson Lake, el. 
 Keep Cool Reservoir, el. 
 Lake Sutherlin, el. 
 Lucas Reservoir, el. 
 Martinsdale Reservoir, el. 
 Newlan Creek Reservoir, el. 
 Stoyanoff Lake, el. 
 Voldseth Reservoir, el. 
 Wertz Reservoir, el. 
 Wertz Reservoir, el. 
 Whitetail Reservoir, el. 
 Willow Creek Reservoir, el.

See also
 List of lakes in Montana

Notes

Bodies of water of Meagher County, Montana
Meagher